Komorówko may refer to the following places in Poland:
Komorówko, Lower Silesian Voivodeship (south-west Poland)
Komorówko, Greater Poland Voivodeship (west-central Poland)
Komorówko, West Pomeranian Voivodeship (north-west Poland)